Temnostoma arciforma is a species of syrphid fly in the family Syrphidae.

Distribution
China.

References

Eristalinae
Insects described in 1995
Diptera of Asia